The 1978 British Formula Three season was the 28th season of the British Formula Three racing. There was once again two major championships contested throughout the year: the British Automobile Racing Club organised BP Super Visco British Formula 3 Championship, and the British Racing Drivers' Club backed Vandervell British Formula 3 Championship. This would be the final year with multiple British championship, with the BARC and BRDC unifying for the following season.

The BARC championship was won by Brazilian driver Nelson Piquet ahead of British driver Derek Warwick, whilst in the BRDC championship, Warwick triumphed over Piquet. Piquet subsequently moved up into Formula One during the same year, driving for the Brabham team in the final Formula 1 race of the season as well as two other teams earlier.

BP Super Visco British F3 Championship
The BARC championship was run over 16 rounds, held at ten different circuits across England and in Monaco and France. The champion was Brazilian Nelson Piquet, ahead of BRDC series champion Derek Warwick

Calendar and results

Final championship standings
Points were awarded to the top six drivers in each race as follows:

Vandervell British F3 Championship
The BRDC championship was run over ten rounds, held at five different circuits across England. The champion was Englishman Derek Warwick, ahead of BARC series champion Nelson Piquet

Calendar and results

Non-championship races

References

British Formula Three Championship seasons
Formula Three